Jane Doe 1980 may refer to the following unidentified people:

Kern County Jane Doe, found on July 15, 1980, in Delano, Kern County, California.
Ventura County Jane Doe, found on July 18, 1980, in Westlake, California.
"Eklutna Annie," found on July 21, 1980, in Eklutna, Anchorage, Alaska.
Arroyo Grande Jane Doe, found on October 5, 1980, in Henderson, Clark County, Nevada.
Walker County Jane Doe, found on November 1, 1980, in Huntsville, Walker County, Texas.

Identified

Sandra Morden, found February 1, 1980 near Amboy, Washington and identified in 2019.
Donna Brazzell, found November 5, 1980 in Rapides Parish, Louisiana and identified in 2019.
Tamara Tigard, AKA "Lime Lady", found April 18, 1980 near Jones, Oklahoma County, Oklahoma and identified in 2020.